Ryuichi Shimoda et al. v. The State was an unsuccessful case brought before the District Court of Tokyo by a group of five survivors of the atomic attacks on Hiroshima and Nagasaki, who claimed the action was illegal under the laws of war and demanded reparations from the Japanese government on the ground that it waived the right for reparations from the U.S. government under the Treaty of San Francisco.

Background
Ever since the atomic bombings of Hiroshima and Nagasaki, there has been legal debate over the action. On August 10, 1945, the Japanese government addressed a communication to the International Committee of the Red Cross, asking it to denounce the U.S. government as performing a crime under international law. Following surrender and the landing of US occupation troops in Japan, the Prime Minister Naruhiko Higashikuni offered not to make any complaints in the media or in legal institutions about the use of the nuclear weapons if the United States Government agreed to drop its demand to try Japanese war criminals. During the Tokyo War Crimes Trial, some of the defence lawyers tried to convince the International Military Tribunal of the Far East to launch a legal investigation into the matter of the legality of the first use of nuclear weapons, but their motions were ignored. One of these defence lawyers, Shoichi Okamoto, continued to deal with the issue after the trial was concluded. In February 1953, he published a booklet titled "Genbaku Minso Wakumon (Questions and Answers on the Civil Lawsuit over the Atomic Bombings)", in which he called upon individuals in Hiroshima and Nagasaki to take legal action against the U.S. government within the U.S. legal system.

Okamoto's plan met great deal of opposition within Japanese society and even in Hiroshima and Nagasaki. Shinzo Hamai, the mayor of Hiroshima at the time, opposed the plan on grounds that the US legal system was not favorable to such actions. As a result, Okamoto gave up the notion of trying the case in a US court and decided to seek action in the Japanese legal system. In co-operation with local organizations in Hiroshima and Nagasaki, a group of five people were selected for the purpose of making the motion in a Japanese court. Shimoda, the leader of the group, came from Hiroshima and was 57 years old. He lost four daughters and one son in the atomic attack on Hiroshima, and he, his wife and surviving son suffered from persistent health problems. A lawyer named Yasuhiro Matsui joined the legal team.

Proceedings at the District Court in Tokyo began in April 1955, and they lasted for eight and a half years until the final ruling was rendered on December 8, 1963. Okamoto died of a stroke in April 1958 and did not live to see the final ruling.

The ruling
On 7 December 1963, in Ryuichi Shimoda et al. v. The State the atomic bombings of Hiroshima and Nagasaki were the subject of a Japanese judicial review. On the 22nd anniversary of the attack on Pearl Harbor, the District Court of Tokyo declined to rule on the legality of nuclear weapons in general, but found that "the attacks upon Hiroshima and Nagasaki caused such severe and indiscriminate suffering that they did violate the most basic legal principles governing the conduct of war".
In the opinion of the court, the act of dropping an atomic bomb on cities was at the time governed by international law found in Hague Convention of 1907 IV - The Laws and Customs of War on Land, and IX - Bombardment by Naval Forces in Time of War, and the Hague Draft Rules of Air Warfare of 1922–1923, and was therefore illegal.

It was reported in the Hanrei Jiho (Law Cases Report), vol. 355, p. 17; translated in The Japanese Annual of International Law, vol. 8, 1964, p. 231. that the facts were that

and that it was held

Aerial bombardment
The judgement draws several distinctions which are pertinent to both conventional and atomic aerial bombardment. On the basis of international law found in Hague Convention of 1907 IV - The Laws and Customs of War on Land, and IX - Bombardment by Naval Forces in Time of War, and the Hague Draft Rules of Air Warfare of 1922–1923, the Court drew a distinction between "Targeted Aerial Bombardment" and indiscriminate area bombardment, that the court called "Blind Aerial Bombardment" and a distinction between a defended and an undefended city. "In principle, a defended city is a city which resists an attempt at occupation by land forces. A city even with defence installations and armed forces cannot be said to be a defended city if it is far away from the battlefield and is not in immediate danger of occupation by the enemy."

The court ruled that blind aerial bombardment is permitted only in the immediate vicinity of the operations of land forces and that only targeted aerial bombardment of military installations is permitted further from the front. It also ruled that the incidental death of civilians and the destruction of civilian property during targeted aerial bombardment was not unlawful. The court acknowledged that the concept of a military objective was enlarged under conditions of total war, but stated that the distinction between the two did not disappear.

The court also ruled that when military targets were concentrated in a comparatively small area, and where defence installations against air raids were very strong, that when the destruction of non-military objectives is small in proportion to the large military interests, or necessity, such destruction is lawful. Thus, in the judgement of the Court, because of the immense power of the atom bombs and the distance from enemy (Allied) land forces, the atomic bombings of both Hiroshima and Nagasaki "was an illegal act of hostilities under international law as it existed at that time, as an indiscriminate bombardment of undefended cities".

Aftermath
One of the main arguments of the court in the Shimoda case, that the waiver of claims in the San Francisco peace treaty precluded any actions for damages by Japanese citizens against the US government, was also used in the US legal system. In the case of Mitsubishi Materials Corporation et al. v. Frank H. Dillman et al., dealing with a lawsuit by a former US prisoner of war against Mitsubishi for its part in the forced labor that he performed during the Second World War, the Superior Court of Orange County rejected the motion and referred to the Shimoda case as follows:

References

Further reading

 Judge T. Koseki (Toshimasa Koseki), Judge Y. Mibuchi (Yoshiko Mibuchi), Judge A. Takakuwa (Akira Takakuwa) (Civil Affairs Division No. 24, Tokyo District Court).  Shimoda et al. v. The State , Tokyo District Court, 7 December 1963. Source:  Hanrei Jiho, vol. 355, p. 17; translated in The Japanese Annual of International Law, vol. 8, 1964, p. 231. Copy on the website of the  International Committee of the Red Cross (ICRC).
原爆裁判・下田事件判決
日本反核法律家協会　【資料】　オスロ会議に向けての提言集

1963 in Japan
Japanese case law
Atomic bombings of Hiroshima and Nagasaki
1963 in case law
1963 in the environment